Virginia (minor planet designation: 50 Virginia) is a large, very dark main belt asteroid. It was discovered by American astronomer James Ferguson on October 4, 1857, from the United States Naval Observatory in Washington, D.C. German astronomer Robert Luther discovered it independently on October 19 from Düsseldorf, and his discovery was announced first.

The reason for Virginia's name is not known; it may be named after Verginia, the Roman noblewoman slain by her father, but it may alternatively have been named after the American state of Virginia.

Photometric observations of this asteroid at the Organ Mesa Observatory in Las Cruces, New Mexico, during 2008 gave a light curve with a period of 14.315 ± 0.001 hours and a brightness variation of 0.19 ± 0.02 in magnitude. The shape of the light curve at the maximum was found to change with phase angle.

The orbit of 50 Virginia places it in an 11:4 mean motion resonance with the planet Jupiter. The computed Lyapunov time for this asteroid is only 10,000 years, indicating that it occupies a chaotic orbit that will change randomly over time because of gravitational perturbations of the planets.

Virginia has been studied by radar.

References

External links 
 
 

Background asteroids
Virginia
Virginia
Virginia
X-type asteroids (Tholen)
Ch-type asteroids (SMASS)
18571004
Resonance with Jupiter